Crowfeet Mountain is located in the Lewis Range, Glacier National Park in the U.S. state of Montana. Crowfeet Mountain is situated on a ridgeline just south of the Ptarmigan Tunnel and is easily seen from Iceberg Lake to the southwest.

See also
 Mountains and mountain ranges of Glacier National Park (U.S.)

References

Mountains of Glacier County, Montana
Mountains of Glacier National Park (U.S.)
Lewis Range
Mountains of Montana